Pyramidellidae, common name the pyram family, or pyramid shells, is a voluminous taxonomic family of mostly small and minute ectoparasitic sea snails, marine heterobranch gastropod molluscs. The great majority of species of pyrams are micromolluscs.

The pyram family is distributed worldwide with more than 6,000 named species in more than 350 nominal genera and subgenera.

This family of micromollusks has been little studied and the phylogenetic relationships within the family are not well worked out. There is an absence of a general consensus regarding which species belong to a specific genus or subgenus, contributing to much confusion. Schander (1999) names more than 300 supraspecific names. As there has been no serious generic revision of the genera worldwide, generic polyphyly can be expected to be rampant throughout the family. However, the family itself is deemed monophyletic. However a study in 2011 seems to indicate that this family is deeply nested within the Pulmonata instead of the Heterobranchia.

The family is currently divided into 11 subfamilies (Ponder & Lindberg 1997). An alternative interpretation is that the family Pyramidellidae is but one of six families within the superfamily Pyramidelloidea (Schander, van Aartsen & Corgan 1999). Many species are rare or infrequently recorded.

Subfamilies
Subfamilies included within the family Pyramidellidae vary according to the taxonomy consulted. The currently leading taxonomy is the taxonomy of Bouchet & Rocroi (2005).

1997 taxonomy 
Taxonomy of Pyramidellidae by Ponder & Lindberg (1997):
 Chrysallidinae Saurin, 1958
 Cingulininae Saurin, 1959
 Cyclostremellinae Moore, 1966
 Eulimellinae Saurin, 1958
 Odostomellinae Saurin, 1959
 Odostomiinae Pelseneer, 1928
 Pyramidellinae J.E. Gray, 1840
 Sayellinae Wise, 1996
 Syrnolinae Saurin, 1958
 Tiberiinae Saurin, 1958
 Turbonillinae Bronn, 1849

1999 taxonomy 
Taxonomy of Pyramidellidae by Schander, Van Aartsen & Corgan (1999):
Superfamily Pyramidelloidea Gray, 1840
Family Amathinidae Ponder, 1987
Family Ebalidae Warén, 1994 - synonym: Anisocyclidae van Aartsen, 1995
Family Odostomiidae Pelseneer, 1928
Subfamily Odostomiinae Pelseneer, 1928
Subfamily Chrysallidinae Saurin, 1958
Subfamily Odostomellinae Saurin, 1958
Subfamily Cyclostremellinae Moore, 1966
Family Pyramidellidae J. E. Gray, 1840
Subfamily Pyramidellinae J. E. Gray, 1840
Subfamily Sayellinae Wise, 1996
Family Syrnolidae Saurin, 1958
Subfamily Syrnolinae Saurin, 1958
Subfamily Tiberiinae Saurin, 1958
Family Turbonillidae Bronn, 1849
Subfamily Turbonillinae Bronn, 1849
Subfamily Eulimellinae Saurin, 1958
Subfamily Cingulininae Saurin, 1959

2005 taxonomy 
Taxonomy of Pyramidellidae by Bouchet & Rocroi (2005):
Subfamily Pyramidellinae Gray, 1840
Tribe Pyramidellini Gray, 1840 - synonyms: Obeliscidae A. Adams, 1863 (inv.); Plotiidae Focart, 1951 (inv.)
Tribe Sayellini Wise, 1996 - formerly subfamily Sayellinae
Subfamily Odostomiinae Pelseneer, 1928
Tribe Odostomiini Pelseneer, 1928 - synonyms: Ptychostomonidae Locard, 1886; Liostomiini Schander, Halanych, Dahlgren & Sundberg, 2003 (n.a.)
Tribe Chrysallidini Saurin, 1958 - formerly subfamily Chrysallidinae, synonyms: Menesthinae Saurin, 1958; Pyrgulininae Saurin, 1959
Tribe Cyclostremellini D. R. Moore, 1966 - formerly subfamily Cyclostremellinae
Tribe Odostomellini Saurin, 1959 - formerly subfamily Odostomellinae
Subfamily Syrnolinae Saurin, 1958 - formerly subfamily Syrnolinae
Tribe Syrnolini Saurin, 1958
Tribe Tiberiini Saurin, 1958 - formerly subfamily Tiberiinae
Subfamily Turbonillinae Bronn, 1849
Tribe Turbonillini Bronn, 1849 - synonym: Chemnitziinae Stoliczka, 1868
Tribe Cingulinini Saurin, 1958 - formerly subfamily Cingulininae
Tribe Eulimellini Saurin, 1958 - formerly subfamily Eulimellinae
 Pyramidellidae incertae sedis 
 Bulimoscilla Robba, 2013
 Maricarmenia Peñas & Rolán, 2017
 Pyrabinella Faber, 2013
 Pyramidellidae incertae sedis insularis Oliver, 1915

In 2010 the family Pyramidellidae has been recognized as monophyletic

In 2017 the genera Helodiamea Peñas & Rolán, 2017 of deep-water Pyramidelloidea from the Central and South Pacific, and the Perheida Peñas & Rolán, 2017 were recognized.

Problematic taxa
The following genera are currently difficult to place within existing subtaxa of the Pyramidellidae.
 Charilda Iredale, 1929
 Contraxiala Laseron, 1956
 Cossmannica Dall & Bartsch, 1904
 Eulimotibera Nomura, 1939
 Finlayola Laws, 1937
 Morrisonetta Brandt, 1968
 Peristichia Dall, 1889
 Ulfa Dall & Bartsch, 1904
 Vagna Dall & Bartsch, 1904

The following species is of uncertain placement within Pyramidellidae.
 "Epigrus" insularis Oliver, 1915

Synonyms
The following genera have become synonyms (but some species in this genera have not yet been reassigned) :
 Actaeopyramis P. Fischer, 1885: synonym of Monotigma G.B. Sowerby II, 1839
 Amaura Møller, 1842: synonym of Aartsenia Warén, 1991
 Auriculina Gray, 1847: synonym of Ondina de Folin, 1870
 Besla Dall & Bartsch, 1904: synonym of Parthenina Bucquoy, Dautzenberg & Dollfus, 1883
 Brachystomia Monterosato, 1884: synonym of Odostomia Fleming, 1813
 Chemnitzia d'Orbigny, 1839: synonym of Turbonilla Risso, 1826
 Elusa A. Adams, 1861: synonym of Tropaeas Dall & Bartsch, 1904
 Folinella Dall & Bartsch, 1904: synonym of Chrysallida Carpenter, 1856
 Iole A. Adams, 1860: synonym of Iolaea A. Adams, 1867
 Iolina Baily, 1948: synonym of Iolaea A. Adams, 1867
 Ividella Dall & Bartsch, 1909: synonym of Chrysallida Carpenter, 1856
 Lonchaeus : synonym of Longchaeus Mörch, 1875
 Moerchiella Thiele, 1924 : synonym of Moerchia A. Adams, 1860
 Moerchinella Thiele, 1931: synonym of Moerchia A. Adams, 1860
 Monoptygma: synonym of Monotigma G.B. Sowerby II, 1839
 Monotygma G.B. Sowerby II, 1839: synonym of Monotigma G.B. Sowerby II, 1839
 Noemia de Folin, 1870: synonym of Noemiamea de Folin, 1886
 Obeliscus Gray, 1847: synonym of Pyramidella Lamarck, 1799
 Obex Laws, 1940: synonym of Obexomia Laws, 1941
 Odontostoma Philippi, 1853: synonym of Odostomia Fleming, 1813
 Odontostomia G.B. Sowerby I, 1839: synonym of Odostomia Fleming, 1813
 Parthenia Lowe, 1840: synonym of Parthenina Bucquoy, Dautzenberg & Dollfus, 1883
 Parthenina Bucquoy, Dautzenberg & Dollfus, 1883: synonym of Chrysallida Carpenter, 1856
 Partulida Schaufuss, 1869: synonym of Chrysallida Carpenter, 1856
 Planipyrgiscus [sic]: synonym of Planpyrgiscus Laws, 1937
 Plotia Röding, 1798: synonym of Pyramidella Lamarck, 1799
 Ptychostomon Locard, 1886: synonym of Odostomia Fleming, 1813
 Pyrgulina A. Adams, 1864: synonym of Chrysallida Carpenter, 1856
 Raoulostraca Oliver, 1915: synonym of Eulimella Forbes & M'Andrew, 1846
 Tragula Monterosato, 1884: synonym of Chrysallida Carpenter, 1856
 Tropeas [sic]: synonym of Tropaeas Dall & Bartsch, 1904

Distribution
This family is found worldwide, but many species are only found in relatively small geographical ranges. The species found at the Cape Verdes are mainly endemic species.

Shell description
The length of the slender, elongated (turreted or conical) shells varies between 0.5 mm and 3.5 cm, but most species in the family have shells which are smaller than 13 mm.

The texture of these shells is smooth or sculptured in various forms such as ribs and spirals. Their color is mostly white, cream or yellowish, sometimes with red or brown lines.

The shell of these snails has a blunt, heterostrophic (i.e. whorls appear to be coiled in the opposite direction to those of the teleoconch) protoconch, which is often pointed sideways or wrapped up. The teleoconch is dextrally coiled, but the larval shells are sinistral. This results in a sinistrally coiled protoconch.

The columella has usually one, but sometimes several, spiral folds. The aperture is closed by an oligogyrous operculum.

The operculum is ovoid and paucispiral, with the apex anterior, a thread-like arcuate ridge on the proximal side, the inner margin notched in harmony with the plaits of the pillar when prominent.

The species are characterized by the lack of jaw or radula, because they are ectoparasites (mostly on polychaetes or other molluscs).

Life habits
The Pyramidellidae are ectoparasites, feeding mainly on other molluscs and on annelid worms, but some are known to feed on peanut worms and crustaceans.
A few species in the family Pyramidellidae, such as Otopleura mitralis,  are symbiotic with sea anemones, such as Neoaiptasia morbilla.

They do not have a radula. Instead their long proboscis is used to pierce the skin of its prey and suck up its fluids and soft tissues. The eyes on the grooved tentacles are situated  toward the base of the tentacles. These tentacles have a concave surface. Between the head and the propodium (the foremost division of the foot), a lobed process called the mentum (= thin projection) is visible. This mentum is slightly indented in midline.

These gastropods are hermaphrodites, laying eggs in jelly-like masses on the shell of its host. Some species have spermatophores.

Name derived from shape
The name of this taxonomic family comes from the shape of the shell, which is like a pyramid.  More specifically, the shape is like a right circular cone, which is equivalent to a right pyramid whose base has many sides.

References

Further reading

External links 

 
 Gallery of pyramidellids

 
Taxa named by John Edward Gray
Gastropod families